Joseph Wilkinson (8 December 1934 – 11 February 2007) was an English professional footballer who played as a goalkeeper. He made 91 appearances in the Football League.

Career
Born in Seaham, County Durham, Wilkinson played for West Auckland Town, Burnley, Bradford City and Hartlepools United.

He joined Bradford City in May 1959, and left the club in February 1960. For them he made 17 appearances in the Football League. He was then transferred to Hartlepools United where he played more regularly, making 74 Football League appearances over three seasons before apparently retiring.  He was in goal when Hartlepools lost 10–1 to Wrexham on 3 March 1962, the club's biggest ever defeat in the Football League.

References

Sportspeople from Seaham
Footballers from County Durham
English footballers
Association football goalkeepers
West Auckland Town F.C. players
Burnley F.C. players
Bradford City A.F.C. players
Hartlepool United F.C. players
English Football League players
1934 births
2007 deaths